Little Harbour    is a community of the Municipality of the District of Shelburne in the Canadian province of Nova Scotia.

References

Little Harbour on Destination Nova Scotia

Communities in Shelburne County, Nova Scotia
General Service Areas in Nova Scotia